The John Thompson Foundation Classic was one of several preseason college football games that emerged in the late 1990s and early 2000s.  Like the other kickoff-type games, it served as an extra game for the participating teams and did not count against the NCAA Division I-A limit of eleven games in a season.  The game was discontinued after the 2002 season, when the NCAA eliminated all such preseason games except for the BCA Classic, which had two years remaining on its television contract and therefore survived until 2004.

The John Thompson Foundation Classic lasted for two seasons - 2001 and 2002 - and was played at the home field of one of the participants.  It raised funds for the John Thompson Foundation, which supports disadvantaged children in inner cities, especially the District of Columbia.

Game Results 

Rankings from AP Poll prior to game.

References 

College football kickoff games
Recurring sporting events established in 2001
Recurring sporting events disestablished in 2002